The women's handball tournament at the 2022 Mediterranean Games was held from 30 June to 6 July in Aïn El Turk and Bir El Djir.

Preliminary round
All times are local (UTC+1).

Group A

Group B

Playoffs

Bracket

Semifinals

Seventh place game

Fifth place game

Bronze medal game

Gold medal game

Final standings

References

Women
Mediterranean Games